Liam Michael Thompson (born 25 April 2000) is a YouTube personality from Auckland, New Zealand. As of September 2022, he has over 2,040,000 subscribers. Thompson's channel consists of a mix of different videos with no common theme; however, his most successful videos tend to include his pet labradoodle, Max. He also often included his 20-year-old cat named Frodo (died February 26 2022).

Early life 
Liam Thompson was born in Auckland, Auckland, New Zealand as the second of four siblings. He attended Balmoral School and Mount Albert Grammar School, where he was a Prefect and involved in orienteering, competing successfully at many regional and national championships. In 2018, he was the inaugural recipient of the Service to MAGS Sport award. After graduating in 2018, Thompson began studying engineering. He soon dropped out to pursue YouTube while enrolling in Police college, moving furniture and considering film school.

Thompson started a blog called Velterro in 2019, focusing on tips for self improvement, productivity, money and health. As of 2021, the blog is inactive.

YouTube Career 
Thompson has been actively posting on YouTube since mid 2019. His channel gained a large amount of traction in September 2019 after posting the video I Taught My Dog To Play Minecraft, which has over 22.3 million views as of February 2022. In an interview with New Zealand media outlet Stuff, he stated that "It took me four months to get 80 [subscribers] and, a week later, I had 150,000". Thompson subsequently decided to pursue YouTube full time.

On 20 July 2020, his YouTube channel reached 1 million subscribers. He celebrated the next day with a video, in which he bought Max 1 million dog biscuits, most of which he donated.  

Thompson is among the top 10 YouTubers in New Zealand, with the 8th most subscribers in September 2020.

In April of 2022, Thompson moved to a new house which meant he wasn't uploading as much but is now uploading regularly.  In June 2022 Thompson got a new cat named Pickle but Thompson wanted to call the cat Samwise.

References 

New Zealand entertainers
People educated at Mount Albert Grammar School
2000 births
People from Auckland
Living people
People educated at Royal New Zealand Police College